Eva Löbau (born 26 April 1972 in Waiblingen, Baden-Württemberg, West Germany) is an Austrian actress. She appeared as Nurse Gretchen Erfurt in the 2011 film Unknown which is set in the German capital city of Berlin. She also played the lead role in Maren Ade's The Forest for the Trees.

References

External links 
 

1972 births
Austrian film actresses
Living people
Austrian television actresses
Austrian stage actresses
21st-century Austrian actresses